TheV0id is the screen name used by an unnamed poker player who won the PokerStars 2007 World Championship of Online Poker, beating a field of 2998 players to the first place and  $1,378,331.00 on October 1, 2007 (then the largest ever online poker prize).

The account registered to Natalie Teltscher, who is the sister of English poker pro Mark Teltscher, was subsequently disqualified and Kyle "ka$ino" Schroeder was promoted to first place winning the $1,378,330.50.

Micky Doft, writing for  PokerNews on 2 September 2010 wrote 

Natalie Teltscher attempted to regain the funds originally won in this tournament and took Poker Stars to court, however, admitting that she never played the tournament and had an "agent" play on her behalf, left her in violation of Stars' rules.

Subsequently Poker Stars released the following: 

The final table lineup consisted of highly successful online players, including professionals Josh Arieh (nitbuster) and Vanessa Rousso (LadyMaverick).  Rousso moved up to second place as a result of TheVOid's disqualification, taking a prize of $700,783.

Later on, Teltscher attempted further legal action against the online poker room but later dropped the lawsuit in 2008.

References

Cheating in gambling
Poker players